Andy Murray was the defending champion, but lost in the third round to Radek Štěpánek.

Grigor Dimitrov won his first grass court title, defeating Feliciano López in the final in three sets, despite being a match point down in the second set.

Seeds
The top eight seeds receive a bye into the second round.

Draw

Finals

Top half

Section 1

Section 2

Bottom half

Section 3

Section 4

Qualifying

Seeds

Qualifiers

Qualifying draw

First qualifier

Second qualifier

Third qualifier

Fourth qualifier

References

Main Draw
Qualifying Draw

Aegon Championships - Singles
2014 Aegon Championships